The first season of Dance Moms, an American dance reality television created by Collins Avenue Productions, began airing on July 13, 2011 on Lifetime's television network. The season concluded on October 12, 2011. A total of 13 episodes aired this season.

Overview
The first season introduces the leading dancers of the Abby Lee Dance Company, and their mothers. Throughout the season the dance team competes at various dance competitions around the US, finally reaching Nationals and competing for the title of overall top dance studio in the country. This season does feature the infamous Pyramid, however, it does not have as much an impact until the final episodes of the season.

Cast
The first season featured 13 star billing cast members with various other dancers and moms appearing throughout the season.

Dancers
 Maddie Ziegler
 Chloe Lukasiak
 Mackenzie Ziegler
 Nia Frazier
 Paige Hyland
 Brooke Hyland
 Vivi-Anne Stein (Episodes 1-8)

Moms
 Melissa Gisoni, mother of Maddie and Mackenzie Ziegler
 Christi Lukasiak, mother of Chloe Lukasiak
 Kelly Hyland, mother of Paige and Brooke Hyland
 Holly Hatcher-Frazier, mother of Nia Frazier
 Cathy Nesbitt-Stein (Episodes 1-8), mother of Vivi-Anne Stein

Guests
 Brandon Pent and mother Diane Pent (Episode 8)
 Justice McCort (Episode 10)
 Taylor O'Lear (Episode 10)

Dance Coaches 

 Abby Lee Miller, head choreographer for the Abby Lee Dance Company
 Gianna Martello, assistant choreographer to Abby Lee Miller
 Cathy Nesbitt-Stein (Episodes 9-10), head choreographer for Candy Apple's Dance Center

Episodes

Reception

Dance Moms received heavy criticism upon its premiere in 2011. On Metacritic, the first season holds a score of 54 out of 100, based on 4 critics, indicating "mixed or average reviews".

References

General references 
 
 
 

2011 American television seasons